Oscar Verona (20 June 1924 – 20 March 2005) was an Italian wrestler. He competed in the men's freestyle light heavyweight at the 1948 Summer Olympics.

References

External links
 

1924 births
2005 deaths
Italian male sport wrestlers
Olympic wrestlers of Italy
Wrestlers at the 1948 Summer Olympics
People from Tarvisio
Sportspeople from Friuli-Venezia Giulia